Arthur & Yu are an American indie folk band from Seattle, Washington, United States. Their sound has been compared to that of various 1960s bands, as well as an aesthetic appeal of John Lennon/Yoko Ono. The duo's title has its roots from childhood nicknames, 'Arthur' and 'Yu', for Olsen and Westcott, respectively. They have been touring across the U.S. in promotion of their debut, In Camera. They were also featured on Dntel's album, Dumb Luck.

History
Olsen stumbled upon Westcott, who had a stint as the bassist for Rogue Wave, through a Craigslist ad, and they were both intrigued at each other's influences. The two met up and began playing demos of each other's songs. The duo originally began playing music in with each other in one another's homes, moving up to local bar shows, without intent of being 'discovered' or signed to a record label. According to a Portland Mercury interview, Olsen explains that the songs were never meant to travel beyond the two, but Sub Pop founder Jonathan Poneman wished to release the songs on his new record label Hardly Art.

In Camera
Having drawn some comparisons to Velvet Underground, the two developed a steady fanbase shortly after their debut In Camera was released on June 19, 2007. The album's name is perhaps a nod to an early film editing technique, but it could also be a reference to the judicial term which can loosely be defined as a secret or private deliberation process. The two have also been featured on Dntel's record Dumb Luck on the fifth track, titled The Distance. The official video can be found here. The band has toured the United States and Japan in support of their debut with bands such as Iron & Wine, Broken Social Scene, Great Lake Swimmers, and The Album Leaf.

Discography

Albums
 In Camera (June 19, 2007)

Collaborations
 The Distance, track five on Dntel's Dumb Luck (April 24, 2007)

References

External links
 Hardly Art's Page for A&Y
 Last.fm Page
 Official Myspace
 Sub Pop review of In Camera

Musical groups from Seattle
Memphis Industries artists